Ingrid Margaretha Cornelia Leijendekker (born 3 October 1975 in Zaandam, North Holland) is a retired water polo player from the Netherlands. She made her debut for the Women's National Team in 1992, and was a regular member of the squad that claimed many international titles during the 1990s. 

Leijendekker competed for her native country at the 2000 Summer Olympics in Sydney, Australia, finishing in fourth place. She was named Most Valuable Player at the 1999 FINA Women's Water Polo World Cup in Sydney.

See also
 List of World Aquatics Championships medalists in water polo

External links
 

1975 births
Living people
Dutch female water polo players
Water polo players at the 2000 Summer Olympics
Olympic water polo players of the Netherlands
Sportspeople from Zaanstad
World Aquatics Championships medalists in water polo
20th-century Dutch women
21st-century Dutch women